Pertti is a Finnish masculine given name.

Notable people

Pertti Ahlqvist, blues musician
Pertti Haikonen, footballer
Pertti Hasanen, ice hockey goalkeeper
Pertti Honkanen, volleyball coach
Pertti Jalava, composer
Pertti Jantunen, football coach
Pertti Jarla, cartoonist
Pertti Kurikka, musician
Pertti Mattila, mathematician
Pertti Niittylä, speed skater
Pertti Salovaara, radiojournalist

References

Finnish masculine given names